Marleen Clemminck (born 2 December 1958) is a Belgian former racing cyclist. She finished in third place in the Belgian National Road Race Championships in 1985.

References

External links

1958 births
Living people
Belgian female cyclists
People from Assenede
Cyclists from East Flanders